9983 Rickfienberg is a carbonaceous asteroid from the middle region of the asteroid belt, approximately  in diameter. It was discovered on 19 February 1995, by American astronomer Dennis di Cicco at his private Sudbury Observatory , Massachusetts, United States. It was named after American astronomer and editor Richard Fienberg.

Orbit and classification 

Rickfienberg is a non-family asteroid of the main belt's background population when applying the hierarchical clustering method to its proper orbital elements. The dark C-type asteroid orbits the Sun in the central main-belt at a distance of 2.4–3.0 AU once every 4 years and 5 months (1,627 days). Its orbit has an eccentricity of 0.12 and an inclination of 8° with respect to the ecliptic. The first observation was taken at the Australian Siding Spring Observatory in 1987, extending the asteroid's observation arc by 8 years prior to its discovery.

Naming 

This minor planet was named for Richard Tresch Fienberg (born 1956) an American astronomer at Rice and Harvard universities, and a stargazer at his private observatory near Danbury, New Hampshire. He is also an editor of the American amateur astronomer magazine Sky & Telescope, after which the minor planet 3243 Skytel is named. The  was published by the Minor Planet Center on 1 May 2003.

Physical characteristics

Lightcurve 

During the asteroid's opposition in November 2011, a rotational lightcurve was obtained from photometric observations at Kitt Peak Observatory. It gave a well-defined rotation period of  hours with a high brightness variation of 1.3 in magnitude, typically indicating a non-spheroidal shape. This period was also confirmed by remodeled data from the Lowell photometric database in March 2016.

Diameter and albedo 

According to the survey carried out by the NEOWISE mission of NASA's Wide-field Infrared Survey Explorer, Rickfienberg measures 7.4 kilometers in diameter and its surface has an albedo of 0.17, while the Collaborative Asteroid Lightcurve Link assumes a standard albedo for carbonaceous asteroids of 0.057 and calculates a diameter of 12.2 kilometers, as the lower the body's albedo (reflectivity), the larger its diameter, at a constant absolute magnitude (brightness).

References

External links 
 Richard Tresch Fienberg, Sky & Telescope, 18 July 2006
 My Place in the Dark, by Richard Tresch Fienberg, Sky & Telescope,17 July 2006
 Lightcurve Database Query (LCDB), at www.minorplanet.info
 Dictionary of Minor Planet Names, Google books
 Asteroids and comets rotation curves, CdR – Geneva Observatory, Raoul Behrend
 Discovery Circumstances: Numbered Minor Planets (5001)-(10000) – Minor Planet Center
 
 

009983
Discoveries by Dennis di Cicco
Named minor planets
19950219